Xiqi (665–651 BC) was briefly the ruler of the State of Jin during the Spring and Autumn period of ancient China.  He was the son of Duke Xian of Jin and his favored concubine Li Ji, and later replaced his older half-brother Shensheng as crown prince.  After the death of Duke Xian, he ascended the throne for about a month before being killed by Li Ke.

Biography
In 665 BC, the twelfth year of the reign of Duke Xian of Jin, Li Ji gave birth to Xiqi. Since Li Ji wanted her son to be the crown prince, she bribed two of Duke Xian's most trusted officials, Liang Wu (梁五) and Dongguan Biwu (東關嬖五). The two officials persuaded Duke Xian of Jin to let princes Shensheng, Chong'er and Yiwu leave the capital, Jiang (絳). The officials told the duke that the northern Rong tribes (戎族) and Di tribes (狄族) frequently attacked Jin such that the princes were needed to defend their territory. Duke Xian then sent Shensheng to defend Quwo (曲沃), modern Quwo County in Shanxi. Duke Xian also sent Chong'er to defend the city of Pu (蒲), northwest of modern Xi County in Shanxi, and Yiwu to Erqu (二屈), modern Ji County in Shanxi.

In the ninth month of 651 BC, Duke Xian died. Li Ji placed the 15-year-old Crown Prince Xiqi on the throne of Jin and made Xun Xi the chancellor of Xiqi to help him in government affairs. On the tenth month of 651 BC, the Jin general Li Ke (里克) killed Xiqi roughly a month after his ascension. Duke Xian of Jin was not yet properly buried at that time. Xun Xi then placed Zhuozi, the younger half-brother of Xiqi, on the throne even though Zhuozi was still a toddler at that time.  In the eleventh month of 651 BC, Li Ke killed Zhuozi and his aunt Li Ji. Xun Xi then committed suicide by hanging himself. Shao Ji, the younger sister of Li Ji and mother of Prince Zhuozi, was imprisoned.

Monarchs of Jin (Chinese state)
7th-century BC Chinese monarchs
665 BC births
651 BC deaths